"You" is a song by British singer-songwriter James Arthur, featuring drums from American musician Travis Barker of rock group Blink-182. It was released as a digital download and for streaming on 11 October 2019, as the sixth single from Arthur's third studio album, You. The song was written by James Arthur, Travis Barker, George Tizzard and Rick Parkhouse.

Background
On 11 October 2019, Arthur announced the release of "You" on Social Media saying, "#YOU with @travisbarker The baddest man to ever play the drums OUT NOW".

Charts

Release history

References

2019 songs
2019 singles
James Arthur songs
Travis Barker songs
Songs written by James Arthur
Songs written by George Tizzard
Songs written by Rick Parkhouse
Songs written by Travis Barker
Song recordings produced by Red Triangle (production team)